Żupy krakowskie was a Polish salt mining company which operated continuously from its inception in the 13th century to the late 20th century. It managed salt mines and salt works in two neighboring towns (known as the Royal Salt Mines collectively), Wieliczka Salt Mine in Wieliczka and Bochnia Salt Mine in Bochnia (city rights, 1253), as well as river salt ports on Vistula and, only in the 17th century, a salt work in Dobiegniewo. The company was created circa 1290 by the Polish Crown, thus giving birth to the largest industrial centre in Europe until the 18th century, according to UNESCO, both in terms of the number of employees and its production volumes.

Żupy krakowskie works ("Żupa" is the Old Polish word for salt mine) was one of the primary sources of income for the Polish Crown until 1772. For most of its existence, it was also one of the largest salt mining enterprises worldwide along with the Alpine salt mines in Hallstatt, Hallein, Hall and Berchtesgaden. It produced of over 30,000 tons a year.

Notably, the castle of the Żupy krakowskie works in Wieliczka is the site of a museum established in 1951, called the Muzeum Żup Krakowskich Wieliczka.

See also

 List of food and beverage museums

References

External links
 Muzeum Żup Krakowskich Wieliczka

Mining companies of Poland
13th-century establishments in Poland
Museums in Lesser Poland Voivodeship
Museums established in 1951
Salt museums
Mining museums in Poland
History museums in Poland
Salt mines in Poland